The Arad Power Station is a large thermal power plant located in Arad, having 2 generation groups of 50 MW each  and one generating unit of 12 MW having a total electricity generation capacity of 112 MW.

The eastern chimney of the power station's two chimneys is 201 meters tall.

See also 

 List of tallest structures in Romania

References

External links
 Official site 

Natural gas-fired power stations in Romania
Coal-fired power stations in Romania